Ischnura pruinescens is a damselfly in the family Coenagrionidae,
commonly known as the colourful bluetail. The taxon has been assessed for the IUCN Red List as being of least concern and is listed in the Catalogue of Life.

Description
Ischnura pruinescens is a small to medium-sized damselfly with a wing span around 35 to 50mm. Adult males have a pruinose coating on the synthorax and some of the abdomen. The females have bright yellow or orange on the synthorax and legs, pale green under the abdomen, and blue markings on segments eight and nine.

Distribution
It is found in Australia and New Guinea.  The Australian distribution covers the north-eastern segment of the continent, from the Gold Coast to Cape York Peninsula in Queensland and west to the tropical parts of the Northern Territory.

Habitat
The colourful bluetail inhabits freshwater pools, lakes, ponds and swamps.

Gallery

References

Ischnura
Odonata of Australia
Insects of Australia
Insects of New Guinea
Taxa named by Robert John Tillyard
Insects described in 1906
Damselflies